Florida is the debut studio album by American DJ Diplo. It was released on Big Dada in 2004. In 2014, it was re-released as F10rida, with 10 extra tracks added, plus bonus commentary.

Critical reception
Florida was described by Ian Roullier of MusicOMH as "an excellent, diverse collection of instrumental hip hop excursions, laid back grooves and whacked out rap tracks." Tim O'Neil of PopMatters said, "Diplo has crafted one of the year's best debut albums, an ambitious ode to the art and craft of sampling."

Track listing

References

External links
 

2004 debut albums
Diplo albums
Albums produced by Diplo
Big Dada albums
Trip hop albums by American artists